Brian Nelson Calley (born March 25, 1977) is an American politician who served as the 63rd lieutenant governor of Michigan from 2011 to 2019. A member of the Republican Party, he was previously elected to the Michigan House of Representatives from 2007 to 2011.

Calley is known for his advocacy for people with autism and their families; his daughter is autistic. Calley campaigned to require Michigan health insurance plans to include coverage for autism therapies, signing into law a package providing for such reforms as acting governor.

Early life and political career
Calley was born in Dearborn, the third of six children. The family moved from Dearborn Heights to Fort Riley, Kansas, in 1982 where his father was stationed in the U.S. Army. Two years later, the family moved back to Michigan where Calley graduated from Ionia High School in 1994. After attending Montcalm Community College while a student at Ionia High School, he earned a bachelor's degree in business administration from Michigan State University in 1998 and a Master's in Business Administration from Grand Valley State University in 2000. In the 10 years preceding his election to the Michigan legislature, Calley held various positions within the banking industry, primarily making commercial loans. During this time he served two terms on Ionia County Board of Commissioners, both as Vice Chairperson.

Calley was elected to the Michigan House of Representatives in 2006 and re-elected in 2008. He served both terms in the minority, with the 2009–2010 term seeing the smallest Republican caucus in 40 years. In the House he gained a reputation as an expert on tax policy and served as minority vice chair of the House Tax Policy Committee. He was named the 2008 "Legislator of the Year” by the state's Small Business Association, the first time a freshman lawmaker has received that designation.

In 2010, despite securing the Republican nomination for state Senate days earlier, Calley was announced as gubernatorial candidate Rick Snyder's running mate. Tea Party supporters from west Michigan momentarily contested Calley's nomination during the state Republican Convention at Michigan State University's Breslin Center in favor of Bill Cooper, a Norton Shores businessman and former candidate for Congress. Cooper withdrew his name from consideration and publicly threw his support behind Calley. In securing the nomination for lieutenant governor, the state Senate nomination was vacated and former state Representative Judy Emmons was chosen to fill the spot.

Snyder and Calley went on to defeat Lansing Mayor Virgil Bernero and his running mate, Southfield Mayor Brenda Lawrence in the general election by 58% to 39%.

Lieutenant Governor (2011–2019)

Calley assumed office as the nation's youngest lieutenant governor and Michigan's youngest lieutenant governor since John Swainson in 1959. Calley undertook an active role in the Snyder administration.

In early 2011, Calley broke a 19-19 deadlock in the Michigan Senate, voting in favor of a massive tax reform package that eliminated the Michigan Business Tax and replaced it with a flat, six-percent corporate income tax. The package, a major goal of the Snyder administration, also reduced the state's individual income tax rate from 4.35 percent to 4.25 percent starting on January 1, 2013, and eliminated most of the state's exemptions and deductions.

For two years, he attended weekly classes at the John F. Kennedy School of Government at Harvard University before receiving his Master of Public Administration in spring 2015.

In May 2017, Calley announced a campaign to make the legislature part-time.

Calley unsuccessfully ran to succeed Snyder in the 2018 Michigan gubernatorial election. On August 7, 2018, he lost the Republican primary, receiving 25% of the vote, placing second behind Michigan state Attorney General Bill Schuette.

Autism advocacy
Calley, whose daughter Reagan is autistic, is known for his outspoken advocacy for autism awareness. As a state lawmaker Calley served on the Health Policy Committee and supported autism insurance reform - unaware his own child actually had the disorder. He stated he first suspected his daughter's condition during a committee hearing as parents of autistic children shared their similar experiences.

As lieutenant governor, Calley is widely credited for leading a successful legislative push to require that insurance companies cover treatments for autism. He signed the bills into law as acting governor while Rick Snyder was on an unannounced trip to Afghanistan. Citing these efforts, Calley was named the 2011 "Executive Champion” by the national autism advocacy organization Autism Speaks.

Electoral history

2018 Michigan gubernatorial Republican primary

As Lt. Governor (with Governor)

33rd District State Senator Republican Primary

As State Representative

References

External links

 Office of the Lieutenant Governor
 Voting Record
 Campaign Site

|-

1977 births
21st-century American politicians
American bankers
Autism activists
American disability rights activists
Eli Broad College of Business alumni
Grand Valley State University alumni
Harvard Kennedy School alumni
Lieutenant Governors of Michigan
Living people
Republican Party members of the Michigan House of Representatives
People from Ionia County, Michigan
Politicians from Dearborn, Michigan
Baptists from Michigan